NA-224 Badin-II is a constituency for the National Assembly of Pakistan.

Members of Parliament

2018-2022: NA-230 Badin-II

Election 2002 

General elections were held on 10 Oct 2002. Fehmida Mirza of PPP won by 71,537 votes.

Election 2008 

General elections were held on 18 Feb 2008. Fehmida Mirza of PPP won by 88,983 votes.

Election 2013 

General elections were held on 11 May 2013. Fehmida Mirza of PPP won by 110,738 votes and became the  member of National Assembly.

Election 2018 

General elections were held on 25 July 2018.

See also
NA-223 Badin-I
NA-225 Sujawal

References

External links 
Election result's official website

NA-225